The borate iodides are mixed anion compounds that contain both borate and iodide anions. They are in the borate halide family of compounds which also includes borate fluorides, borate chlorides, and borate bromides.

List

References 

Borates
Iodides
Mixed anion compounds